The Enemy of My Enemy may refer to:
 The Enemy of My Enemy (Michael book), a 2006 book by political science professor George Michael
 The Enemy of My Enemy (novel), a 2018 novel by W.E.B. Griffin and William E. Butterworth IV
 The Enemy of My Enemy (Charlie Jade), an episode of the TV series Charlie Jade
 The Enemy of My Enemy (Robin Hood), an episode of the TV series Robin Hood

See also
 The enemy of my enemy is my friend, an ancient proverb
 "Enemy of My Enemy", a 2012 episode of science-fiction drama Fringe
 Enemy's Enemy, a novel in the Carl Hamilton series by Jan Guillou